Lucas Alves (born 27 March 2002) is a Brazilian professional footballer who plays as an attacking midfielder for Campeonato Brasileiro Série A club Grêmio.

Club career
Born in Foz do Iguaçu, Brazil, Gazão Henrique joined the Grêmio's Academy at the age of 16 in 2018.

Career statistics

Club

References

External links

Profile at the Grêmio F.B.P.A. website

2002 births
Living people
Brazilian footballers
Association football midfielders
Campeonato Brasileiro Série A players
Grêmio Foot-Ball Porto Alegrense players
People from Foz do Iguaçu
Sportspeople from Paraná (state)